Spenge is a town in the district of Herford, in North Rhine-Westphalia, Germany

Geography
Spenge is situated north of Bielefeld and west of Herford. It borders Lower Saxony in the west.

Subdivisions
Spenge consists of 5 subdivisions (population as of December 31, 2001):
 Bardüttingdorf (1,480 inhabitants)
 Hücker-Aschen (1,465 inhabitants)
 Lenzinghausen (2,793 inhabitants)
 Spenge (8,696 inhabitants)
 Wallenbrück (1,976 inhabitants)

Towns and local subdistricts

 Affhüpperhöfe
 Bardüttingdorf
 Baringdorf
 Blomeier Hof
 Bockhorst
 Bruning
 Detert-Kriese
 Diemke
 Düttingdorf
 Ellersiek
 Gehlenbrink
 Grafahrend
 Hannighorst
 Harrenheide
 Heistersiek
 Helligen
 Helliger Heide
 Hücker
 Hücker Dorf
 Hücker Kreuz
 Hücker-Aschen
 Hülsmann Hof
 Kisker
 Klein Aschen
 Klockenbrink
 Lenzinghausen
 Mantershagen
 Mark
 Martmühle
 Mühlenburg
 Nagelsholz
 Neuenfeld
 Nordspenge
 Placken
 Riepe
 Söttringhausen
 Spenger Heide
 Südholz
 Südspenge
 Vahrenhölzerhöfe
 Wallenbrück
 Werburg
 Westerhausen
 Wichlinghauserhöfe
 Wullbrede

Mayors of the town Sprenge
1969–1984: Karl Obermann (UWG)
1984–1995: Karl-Heinz Wiegelmann (SPD)
1995–2009: Christian Manz (born 1954),  (CDU)
2009–today: Bernd Dumcke (SPD)

Notable places
 Lutheran Church of Sankt Martin built in the 13th Century, within the Altar of St. Martin, created around 1470.

 Marienkirche in Wallenbrück built 1096, to the west of Spenge
 Mühlenburg Castle built in 1468.

Sons and daughters of the town

 Eberhard Werdin (1911–1991), composer and music pedagogue
 Friedrich-Wilhelm Graefe zu Baringdorf (born 1942), politician (Alliance '90 / The Greens), 1984–1987 and 1989–2009 Member of the European parliament

References

External links

 Official site 

Herford (district)